Mohammed Fadi Beko (born 6 May 1991), commonly known as Fadi Beko, is a Syrian footballer who plays for Samail SC in Oman First Division League.

References

External links
 
 Fadi Beko – YouTube

1991 births
Living people
Sportspeople from Aleppo
Syrian Muslims
Syrian footballers
Syrian expatriate footballers
Association football forwards
Al-Ittihad Aleppo players
Expatriate footballers in Egypt
Syrian expatriate sportspeople in Egypt
Expatriate footballers in Yemen
Syrian expatriate sportspeople in Oman
Expatriate footballers in Oman
Syrian Premier League players